Fauresmith may refer to:
 Fauresmith, a town in South Africa
 Fauresmith (industry), a culture of stone tools at the beginning of the Middle Stone Age some 420,000 years ago